Mowry may refer to:

People
 Mowry Baden (born 1936), American sculptor

Surname
 Daniel Mowry Jr. (1729–1806), American cooper and farmer
 George E. Mowry (1909–1984), American historian
 Jess Mowry (born 1960), American author
 Joe Mowry (1908–1994), American baseball player
 Larry Mowry (born 1936), American professional golfer
 Martha H. Mowry (1818–1899), American physician
 Richard Mowry (1748–1835), American farmer
 Sylvester Mowry (1833-1871), American politician, miner, land speculator
 Tahj Mowry (born 1987), American actor
 Tamera Mowry (born 1978), American actress
 Tia Mowry (born 1978), American actress
 William Augustus Mowry (1829–1917), American educator and writer

Other uses
 Mowry, Arizona, a ghost town and the site of the Mowry massacres
 Mowry City, New Mexico, a ghost town
 Mowry Slough, San Francisco Bay
 William Mowry House, North Smithfield, Rhode Island

See also
 Mowry House (disambiguation)
 Mowrystown, Ohio
 
 Mowery, a surname